Albanian Supercup 2006 is the 13th edition of the Albanian Supercup since its establishment in 1989. The match was contested between the Albanian Cup 2006 winners KF Tirana and the 2005–06 Albanian Superliga champions KS Elbasani.

Details

See also
 2005–06 Albanian Superliga
 Albanian Cup 2006

References

RSSSF.com

2006
Supercup
Albanian Supercup, 2006
Albanian Supercup, 2006